Joseph William Henry Makepeace (22 August 1881 – 19 December 1952) was an English sportsman who appeared for his country four times at each of cricket and football. He is one of just 12 English double internationals.

Cricket
Makepeace played in four Tests for England in the 1920–21 Ashes series in Australia. His first-class career with Lancashire lasted from 1906 to 1930. "I count Makepeace amongst the immortals of Lancashire and Yorkshire cricket," wrote Neville Cardus. Dudley Carew described Makepeace as "a master against the turning ball on a difficult pitch", and continued:

There was little to catch the eye about his batting, but he was the most pleasing of defensive batsmen, of men whose art rises to the heights under the challenge of adversity. ... The fireworks, the rockets, and the frenzies of big hitting are admirable in their way, but cricket would not be the enchanting game it is were it not for the quiet beauty of the game's less riotous colours; Clare wrote poetry as well as Shelley, and Makepeace was of his school.

After his retirement from playing, Makepeace spent two decades as county coach.

When Albert Chevallier Tayler was preparing his 1906 painting, Kent vs Lancashire at Canterbury, he arranged sittings with the winning Kent team he was commissioned to celebrate. Tayler also intended to do include Makepeace. Makepeace however was unable to attend a sitting, so Tayler compromised by using William Findlay as the batsman. Findlay had not actually played in that particular match, but he was able to travel to Tayler's London studio as he had just been appointed as secretary of Surrey County Cricket Club.

Football
Makepeace made 336 appearances and scored 23 goals for Everton between 1902 and 1919 and was a member of the team that won the FA Cup in 1906. He was also a member of the Everton team which won the First Division Championship in Season 1914–15. He made four appearances as a wing half for the England national football team between 1906 and 1912 and also represented the Football League XI. He is an inductee in Everton's Hall of Fame.

Personal life 
Makepeace served as a flight sergeant in the Royal Air Force during the First World War.

References

External links

1881 births
1952 deaths
Footballers from Middlesbrough
People from Bebington
Lancashire cricketers
England Test cricketers
English cricketers
English footballers
Everton F.C. players
England international footballers
English Football League players
Association football wing halves
English Football League representative players
Cricketers from Middlesbrough
Marylebone Cricket Club cricketers
English cricketers of 1919 to 1945
Royal Air Force personnel of World War I
North v South cricketers
Royal Air Force airmen
FA Cup Final players